Latvand-e Baraftab (also Romanized as Latvand-e Barāftāb and Latvand-e Bar Āftāb; also known as Latvand and Laqvand-e Barāftāb) is a village in Miyankuh-e Sharqi Rural District, Mamulan District, Pol-e Dokhtar County, Lorestan Province, Iran. At the 2006 census, its population was 94, in 19 families.

References 

Towns and villages in Pol-e Dokhtar County